Summit Hill is a borough in Carbon County, Pennsylvania, United States.  It is part of Northeastern Pennsylvania. The population was 3,034 at the 2010 census. 

Summit Hill was the western terminus of the United States' second operational railway, the Mauch Chunk Switchback Railway. It was the site of some of the earliest coal mines developed in North America, where the Lehigh Coal & Navigation Company began mining in 1792, establishing the town initially as little more than a mining camp with stables and paddocks.

History

Anthracite coal was discovered on the ridgeline of Sharpe Mountain (now known as Pisgah Mountain) in 1791 by a hunter. News of the find led to the founding of the Lehigh Coal Mining Company, which in 1792 began exploring the area in earnest and buying up promising land. Coal was found in 1794 by Phillip Ginter along the northeast-to-southwest-running ridgeline of Pisgah Mountain lying several hundred feet below the ridge on the north slope in an area that became the boroughs of Summit Hill and Lansford.

Summit Hill High School was added to the National Register of Historic Places in 2001.

Geography
Summit Hill is located in western Carbon County at  (40.827420, -75.865892). The main development of the borough is on the crest of Pisgah Mountain, but the borough limits extend north to the ridgecrest of Nesquehoning Mountain, south to the far side of Mauch Chunk Mountain, and east to cover most of Mauch Chunk Lake. Also on the northern border is the borough of Lansford, while Tamaqua in Schuylkill County is on the western border.

Demographics

As of the census of 2000, there were 2,974 people, 1,291 households, and 844 families residing in the borough. The population density was 333.7 people per square mile (128.9/km2). There were 1,451 housing units at an average density of 162.8 per square mile (62.9/km2). The racial makeup of the borough was 98.99% White, 0.07% African American, 0.10% Native American, 0.17% Asian, 0.07% from other races, and 0.61% from two or more races. Hispanic or Latino of any race were 0.40% of the population.

There were 1,291 households, out of which 25.3% had children under the age of 18 living with them, 50.1% were married couples living together, 10.6% had a female householder with no husband present, and 34.6% were non-families. 31.4% of all households were made up of individuals, and 18.5% had someone living alone who was 65 years of age or older. The average household size was 2.30 and the average family size was 2.86.

In the borough the population was spread out, with 20.1% under the age of 18, 6.9% from 18 to 24, 27.6% from 25 to 44, 23.4% from 45 to 64, and 22.1% who were 65 years of age or older. The median age was 42 years. For every 100 females, there were 92.7 males. For every 100 females age 18 and over, there were 89.9 males.

The median income for a household in the borough was $37,287, and the median income for a family was $44,500. Males had a median income of $36,627 versus $23,507 for females. The per capita income for the borough was $21,166. About 4.0% of families and 7.5% of the population were below the poverty line, including 8.4% of those under age 18 and 6.2% of those age 65 or over.

Summit Hill is part of the Panther Valley School District, along with the neighboring towns of Lansford, Nesquehoning and Coaldale (Coaldale is located in Schuylkill County).

Transportation

Pennsylvania Route 902 is the only numbered highway serving Summit Hill. It follows North Street, Pine Street, Amidon Street and Laurel Drive along a northwest-southeast alignment through the middle of the borough.

Notable people 

Thomas F. Breslin, Bataan Death March prisoner
Francis James Furey, Archbishop of San Antonio
Joe Gormley, MLB player
Keith McCall, former Speaker of the Pennsylvania House of Representatives
Samuel McLean, congressman
Maria Zuber, planetary scientist

References

External links
Borough of Summit Hill official website
Summit Hill history book

Populated places established in 1880
Boroughs in Carbon County, Pennsylvania
1880 establishments in Pennsylvania
1818 establishments in Pennsylvania
Municipalities of the Anthracite Coal Region of Pennsylvania